Emperor Qinzong of Song (23 May 1100 – 14 June 1161), personal name Zhao Huan, was the ninth emperor of the Song dynasty of China and the last emperor of the Northern Song dynasty.

Emperor Qinzong was the eldest son and heir apparent of Emperor Huizong. His mother was Emperor Huizong's empress consort, Empress Wang. In 1126, when the forces of the Jurchen-led Jin Empire invaded the Song Empire beginning the first siege of Bianjing. Frightened, Emperor Huizong intended to flee but was convinced by his officials to abdicate first and then flee. Huizong then abdicated and passed on his throne to Emperor Qinzong, and then assumed the title Taishang Huang ("Retired Emperor") himself and fled to the countryside.

Reign 
Left to deal with the Jin invasion by himself, Emperor Qinzong appointed the general Li Gang to lead the Song military to fend off the invaders. However, Emperor Qinzong was not a decisive leader and often made poor judgments. Eventually, he removed Li Gang from his appointment in the hope of starting peace talks with the Jin Empire and sent his younger brother Zhao Gou to negotiate but he was captured and ransomed. This may contribute to Emperor Gaozong's decision to not rescue Qinzong. The first siege of Bianjing ended after Qinzong gave a city to the Jurchens and paid them annual tribute. Emperor Huizong returned after hearing that the siege was over.

Causes of the Second Siege of Bianjing 
Despite this, almost as soon as the Jin armies had left Kaifeng, Emperor Qinzong reneged on the deal and dispatched two armies to repel the Jurchen troops attacking Taiyuan and bolster the defenses of Zhongshan and Hejian. An army of 90,000 soldiers and another of 60,000 were defeated by Jin forces by June. A second expedition to rescue Taiyuan was also unsuccessful. Emperor Qinzong rejected an proposal to reinforce the northern borders reasoning that they may never come back and sent his generals to other parts of the country. The Jin imperial court sent two ambassadors to Song. The two ambassadors were nobles from the former Liao dynasty. Emperor Qinzong misjudged the situation and believed that they could be used to turn against the Jin ruler, Emperor Taizong. Emperor Qinzong sent a coded letter which was sealed in candle wax, inviting them to join Song to form an Anti–Jin alliance but the ambassadors handed the letter to Emperor Taizong and in retaliation, accused Emperor Qinzong for violating the peace treaty and sent an even bigger army against the Song.

Capture 

Since Qinzong mistakenly removed the army to post in different parts of the country, the Jin forces eventually breached the walls of the Song capital, Bianjing, in 1127 and occupied the city in an event historically known as the Jingkang Incident ("Jingkang" was the era name of Emperor Qinzong.) Emperor Qinzong, along with his father Emperor Huizong and the rest of their family, were taken prisoner by Jin forces, marking the end of the Northern Song. Qinzong's brother Zhao Gou managed to escape to southern China, where he reestablished the empire as the Southern Song dynasty and became historically known as Emperor Gaozong.

Life in the Jin Dynasty 
Emperor Qinzong and his father were demoted to the status of commoners on 20 March 1127 and deported to Huining Prefecture, the Jin capital, on 13 May 1127. In 1128, the two former Song emperors were forced to wear mourning dresses and pay homage to the ancestors of the Jin Emperors at their ancestral temple in Huining Prefecture. Furthermore, the Jurchen ruler, Emperor Taizong, gave the two former Song emperors contemptuous titles to humiliate them: Emperor Qinzong was called "Marquis Chonghun" (重昏侯; literally "Doubly Muddle-headed Marquis") while Emperor Huizong was called "Duke Hunde" (昏德公; literally "Muddle-headed Duke").

In 1141, as the Jin Empire normalised relations with the (Southern) Song Empire, the Jurchens renamed Emperor Qinzong's title to the more neutral-sounding "Duke of Tianshui Commandery", which is based on a commandery located in the upper reaches of the Wei River. A few months later, the former emperor started receiving a stipend due to his nobility status. He lived the rest of his life as a captive in the Jin Empire, which used him as a hostage to put pressure on the Song Empire.

In 1142, Emperor Gaozong signed the Treaty of Shaoxing which made peace with the Jin Dynasty. This destroyed Qinzong's chance of returning.

In 1156, in an act of humiliation, the Jin Emperor who at the time was the Prince of Hailing ordered him and the former Emperor Tianzuo of Liao to compete in a match of polo. Emperor Qinzong was weak and frail, thus quickly fell off the horse. Emperor Tianzuo himself despite being very old, was more familiar to horse riding, tried to escape but was shot to death by Jurchen archers.

Emperor Qinzong died as a sick and broken man in 1161 having spent two-thirds of his life in the Jin Dynasty. He was 61. His temple name means "Venerate Ancestor".

Family
Consorts and Issue:
 Empress Renhuai, of the Zhu clan (1102–1127)
 Zhao Chen, Crown Prince (1117–1128), first son
 Princess Roujia (b. 1121)
 Virtuous Consort Shen, of the Zhu clan (1110–1142)
 Zhao Jin (b. 1127), second son
 A daughter (b. 1130)
 Cairen, of the Zheng clan, personal name Qingyun
 Zhao Xun (b. 1129), third son
Cairen, of Han clan (才人 韓氏), personal name Jingguan (靜觀)
 A son (b. 1128)
 Cairen, of the Di clan (b. 1114), personal name Yuhui
 A daughter (b. 1129)

Ancestry

See also
Chinese emperors family tree (middle)
List of emperors of the Song dynasty
Architecture of the Song dynasty
Culture of the Song dynasty
Economy of the Song dynasty
History of the Song dynasty
Society of the Song dynasty
Technology of the Song dynasty
Jin–Song Wars

References

 
 
 
  (hardcover); 
 

1100 births
1161 deaths
Northern Song emperors
Monarchs taken prisoner in wartime
12th-century Chinese monarchs
People from Kaifeng
Heads of government who were later imprisoned